Michael Alexander Rose (born 11 October 1995) is a Scottish professional footballer who plays for Coventry City as a defender. Rose began his career with Aberdeen and has also played on loan for Forfar Athletic.

Career
Raised in Bridge of Don, Rose attended Oldmachar Academy and started his early career with Glendale, Aberdeen and Lewis United.

Before making a senior appearance for Aberdeen, he joined Forfar Athletic on loan for one month on 5 November 2015, with the loan then being extended for a further month on 7 December 2015.

Rose made his debut for Aberdeen in a 3–0 defeat against St Johnstone on 22 April 2016. It was announced by Aberdeen on 16 May 2016, that he would leave the club at the end of the 2015–16 season. After leaving Aberdeen, Rose signed for newly promoted Scottish Championship side Ayr United in June 2016.

Rose signed a pre-contract agreement with Coventry City in January 2019.

Career statistics

Honours
Ayr United
Scottish League One: 2017–18

References

1995 births
Living people
Scottish footballers
Footballers from Aberdeen
People educated at Oldmachar Academy
Aberdeen F.C. players
Forfar Athletic F.C. players
Ayr United F.C. players
Scottish Professional Football League players
Association football defenders
Lewis United F.C. players
Coventry City F.C. players
English Football League players